Chiba may refer to:

Places

China 
 , town in Jianli County, Jingzhou, Hubei

Japan 
 Chiba (city), capital of Chiba Prefecture
 Chiba Station, a train station
 Chiba Prefecture, a sub-national jurisdiction in the Greater Tokyo Area on the eastern coast of Honshū
 Port of Chiba, Chiba Prefecture

People
 Chiba (musician), American rapper
 Chiba (surname)

Other uses
 Chiba (instrument), a Chinese woodwind
 Chiba, slang for cannabis
 Chiba Engine, a server-based engine written in Java, see FormEngine
 Chiba Thermal Power Station, Japan
 Chiba University, a national university in the city of Chiba

See also

Chica (disambiguation)
Chika (disambiguation)